Takahashi is a Japanese surname.

Takahashi may also refer to:

Geographical locations
Takahashi, Okayama (written 高梁), a city in Okayama prefecture, Japan
Takahashi River, a river in Japan

Other uses
Ward-Takahashi identities, a feature of quantum mechanics
The Takahashi correlation is an expression used in mass transfer equations for chemical engineering that corrects for high pressure in calculating diffusion coefficients between two molecules
Takahashi method, a presentation style pioneered by Masayoshi Takahashi

See also
Takahashi Seisakusho, manufacturer of astronomical telescopes